The West Chester University "Incomparable" Golden Rams Marching Band (IGRMB) is the marching band for West Chester University known for its drum corps style and nationally renowned percussion section.

The band, which has over 300 members, performs pre-game, halftime, or post-game at all home and select away WCU football games in Pennsylvania, New Jersey, and in Delaware. The band performs in parades and high school marching band competitions, and the annual Collegiate Marching Band Festival in Allentown, Pennsylvania.

Honors 
In 1993, the band performed pregame for Game 3 of the World Series in Philadelphia. 

In 2009 and 2018, the band attended the Bands of America Grand National Championships in Indianapolis, an honor given to only two college bands in the United States each year. 

In 2015, the band was selected to perform in the Macy's Thanksgiving Day Parade, one of the few college bands to receive the honor. 

In 2019, The IGRMB was awarded the Sudler Trophy by the John Philip Sousa Foundation. This is the first time in history that a NCAA Division II university received this honor.

In 2021, The IGRMB was selected to perform at the home opener for the Philadelphia Eagles.

The IGRMB was selected to perform in the 2024 edition of the Rose Parade, the first time the band has been honored with an invitation.

References

External links

West Chester University
West Chester, Pennsylvania
Bands
Musical groups from Pennsylvania
College marching bands in the United States
Marching bands
West Chester Golden Rams
West Chester Golden Rams football